Sar Rig-e Owl (also Romanized as Sar Rīg-e Owl; also known as Sar Rīg-e Yek and Sarrīq-e Meygūnī) is a village in Isin Rural District, in the Central District of Bandar Abbas County, Hormozgan Province, Iran. At the 2006 census, its population was 706, in 161 families.

References 

Populated places in Bandar Abbas County